Campo Pio XI is an association football stadium in Rome, Italy. The stadium hosts all of Vatican City's football activities, including the Vatican City Championship, the Clericus Cup, and the Vatican City national football teams. It is also home to the Petriana Calcio, an amateur youth multi-sport club.

Overview
The Pio XI multi-sport complex is located on an 18-acre piece of land in Rome only a few hundred yards from Vatican City as Vatican City is not large enough to house sports fields of its own. It has a capacity of 500 spectators and is equipped with artificial turf and floodlights. The field is known for having a clear view of Saint Peter's Basilica.

History
The Campo Pio XI stadium is part of one of several sports complexes built, funded, and maintained by the Italian Knights of Columbus. The fraternal organization began building free recreational facilities for Roman Catholic youth in 1920 after Pope Benedict XV asked the Order to do so. The field was consecrated and blessed by Cardinal Pietro Gasparri, Vatican Secretary of State, in May 1926. 

Serie A club AS Roma hosts youth tournaments at the stadium.

On 10 June 2018, during Vatican Family Day, the stadium hosted the first Vatican women's football match following that year's Vatican Super Cup. Shortly thereafter it became home to the nascent Vatican City women's national football team.

International matches
After playing its first three full-internationals at the Stadio Pio XII, the stadium hosted the Vatican City national football team for the first time on 10 May 2014.

List of matches

References

External links
 Images of the Stadium

Football
Petriana
Italy
Vatican City national football team